Rutland High School is a senior high school located in Rutland, Vermont, and attended by students in grades 9-12. It has been located on Stratton Road since 1994. Prior to 1994 Rutland High School was located on Library Avenue (current Rutland Intermediate School).  Prior to the Library Avenue location, Rutland High School was on Center Street (current Rutland City Fire Department location). The high school is a part of the Rutland City Public School District. 

The school is accredited by the New England Association of Schools and Colleges (NEASC). Its initial accreditation was in 1944, and its next review will be in 2029. As of its last accreditation the school had 820 students.

The school is a comprehensive high school, and was founded in 1855. The school is located in an urban setting. It utilizes a 7.25 school day for 178 days a year. The school colors are red and black, with the mascot being the Raiders.

Athletics 
Rutland High School Championships:

Football (Prior to 1970 the Champion was picked by sports writers) - 1938, 1939, 1942, 1945, 1948, 1951, 1954, 1960, 1984, 1991, 1996, 1997, 2000, 2001, 2003, 2004, 2006, 2015

Boys Soccer - 2001

Field Hockey - 1993, 1994, 1995

Boys Golf - 1984, 1988, 2003, 2006, 2013, 2014, 2017

Girls Golf - 2000, 2004, 2005, 2006, 2007, 2008, 2009, 2012, 2013, 2014, 2015

Cross Country - 1980, 1981, 1983

Boys Basketball - 1928, 1933, 1947, 1952, 1958, 1967, 2017, 2018

Girls Basketball - 2005, 2020

Boys Hockey - 1983, 1995

Girls Hockey - 2017

Boys Alpine Skiing - 1987, 1993, 1994, 1997, 1998, 2001, 2004, 2010

Girls Alpine Skiing - 1988, 1990, 1993, 1994, 1995, 1996, 1997, 2001, 2003, 2004, 2007, 2008, 2009, 2010

Nordic Skiing - 2001, 2002, 2009

Boys Indoor Track - 1984, 1985, 2001, 2002

Girls Indoor Track - 1984, 2001, 2002, 2003, 2004

Cheerleading - 1991, 2002, 2006, 2007, 2009, 2010, 2013, 2015, 2016, 2017, 2018, 2019, 2020, 2021

Baseball - 1950, 1974, 1982

Softball - 1980, 1982, 2000

Girls Lacrosse - 2009

Boys Tennis - 1986

Girls Tennis - 1975, 1977, 1981

Track and Field - 1926, 1937, 1938, 1939, 1947, 1948, 1949, 1974, 1975, 1976, 1983, 2002

Notable alumni
 William Carris (1963), businessman and member of the Vermont Senate
 Percival W. Clement (1862), governor of Vermont
 William D. Cohen (1975), associate justice of the Vermont Supreme Court
 Jake Eaton (1999), professional football player
 Joy Hakim (1947), teacher and author
 Jim Jeffords (1952), U.S. senator
 Lawrence C. Jones (1912), Vermont Attorney General
 Jim McCaffrey (1981), professional basketball player
 Kevin J. Mullin (1975), member of the Vermont House of Representatives and Vermont Senate
 Joseph F. Radigan (1924), United States Attorney for Vermont
 Milford K. Smith (1924), associate justice of the Vermont Supreme Court
 Robert Stafford (1931), U.S. senator
 Richard C. Thomas (1955), Secretary of State of Vermont
 Leonard F. Wing (1914), attorney and Vermont Army National Guard major general
 John E. Woodward (1887), U.S. Army brigadier general

References

External link

Buildings and structures in Rutland, Vermont
Public high schools in Vermont
Schools in Rutland County, Vermont
1855 establishments in Vermont
Educational institutions established in 1855